Doug Dohring is the founder, CEO, and Executive Chairman of Age of Learning, Inc., the edtech company that created and runs ABCmouse.com Early Learning Academy, ReadingIQ, Adventure Academy, and My Math Academy and My Reading Academy for schools and districts. He is also the Chairman of the philanthropic Age of Learning Foundation, a member of the UNESCO Global Education Coalition. Prior to Age of Learning, Dohring founded and served as CEO of Neopets, Inc.

The Dohring Company
Dohring founded market research firm The Dohring Company in 1986, where he served as Chairman and CEO. Customers for the company's market research services included retail chains including Baskin-Robbins and House of Fabrics, and entertainment firms including Capitol Records, as well as automotive, financial services, and health care companies. Automotive surveys comprised up to 80% of the firm's business in 1995. At that time, the company was ranked 55th on the Advertising Age list of the nation's largest market research firms. It was 92nd on the Los Angeles Business Journal 's 1995 list of fastest growing private companies in Los Angeles County.

Neopets

Dohring founded Neopets, Inc. after being introduced to the Neopets.com site by a mutual friend upon its December, 1999 launch by two British college students, Adam Powell and Donna Williams. According to BusinessWeek, Dohring bought the site immediately thereafter, with the goal of making it "a safe haven for kids." In April, 2000, he brought in his first advertising partners for a concept that he trademarked as immersive advertising.

According to a Harvard Business School case study, Neopets, Inc. had reached profitability four months after launching operations, "largely due to the fact that it spends nothing for customer acquisition, relying strictly on word-of-mouth," and as of July 2001, the site was ranked #4 in "stickiness".

Two years after its creation, in December 2001, Neopets had attracted more than 20 million accounts, more than 80% of them under the age of 17. While the " tech bubble" was bursting and large percentages of new websites were folding, Neopets was signing up 50,000 new accounts per day, with members spending an average of four hours or more per month on the site. CNET cited Neopets as "one of the top three gaming sites on the Web, according to Jupiter Media Metrix".

Advertising Age listed Dohring and Neopets in their 2001 "Roster of Marketing 100s", noting that in July 2001 the site was ranked the "stickiest" at-home web site by Nielsen/Net Ratings.

Dohring sold the Neopets site to Viacom's MTV Network in June 2005 for $160 million. At the time, approximately 140 million Neopets had been created, and Neopets ranked among the top 10 stickiest Web sites, with advertising making up about 60% of the company's revenues and a line of plush toys sold through Target Corporation and other stores.

Age of Learning, Inc. and ABCmouse.com
After the sale of Neopets to Viacom in 2005, Dohring founded Age of Learning, Inc., in 2007, and launched the ABCmouse.com Early Learning Academy, website in 2010. The Wall Street Journal reported that ABCmouse was "designed to teach basic reading, math, science and other subjects to children between the ages of two and six." At Age of Learning, Dohring assembled an education advisory board that collaborates on the design of the ABCmouse curriculum and includes Kimberly Oliver Burnim, National Teacher of the Year in 2006, and Kevin O'Donnell, creator of PBS series, Liberty's Kids. Unlike Neopets, which relied on advertising, ABCmouse.com charges a subscription of $12.99 per month or $59.99 per year, and is free to individual teachers, libraries, Head Start programs, and other community organizations. Research has shown ABCmouse "helped to accelerate students' learning gains in literacy and mathematics skills on multiple assessments."

In 2016, Age of Learning launched ABCmouse for Schools, a solution aimed at school districts and groups rather than families or individual teachers. ABCmouse for Schools includes student management, professional development, curriculum alignment, and progress reporting tools in addition to the core ABCmouse curriculum.

Age of Learning, a privately held company, was reported to have reached a $1 billion valuation based on $150 million in funding from ICONIQ Capital in May 2016. A subsequent round of funding in June, 2021, led by TPG, raised another $300 million,   which valued the company at $3 billion.

In January 2017, Age of Learning expanded the ABCmouse curriculum through 2nd grade.

In November 2018, the company launched a digital library and literacy platform, called ReadingIQ, which offers thousands of books for children ages 2 through 12. ReadingIQ is available to families at a monthly or annual fee and is free for teachers. In January 2021, Age of Learning partnered with the Florida House of Representatives to give all Florida families free access to the ReadingIQ digital library as part of a statewide literacy initiative.

Age of Learning launched another online learning platform called Adventure Academy in May 2019. Adventure Academy is an educational MMO for elementary and middle school children.

In September 2019, the company appointed former Disney executive Paul Candland as CEO with Dohring being named the Executive Chairman. Mr. Candland served as CEO until April, 2022, at which time Doug Dohring resumed his position as CEO.

In January 2020, Dohring announced the formation of the Age of Learning Foundation, which offers free access to Age of Learning digital education programs, at the Education World Forum.

Other business ventures
Dohring was also a principal shareholder in Speedyclick.com circa 1999-2001, which according to a December 2005 Wired Magazine article, "he later sold for $50 million." The $50 million deal included $3 million in cash and $47 million in ShopNow stock, (later renamed as "Network Commerce", and deemed worthless in 2001).

Personal life
A California native, Dohring is the youngest son of a car dealer and a homemaker. He and his wife Laurie, both Scientologists, have been married since 1979. They have five children including two sets of identical twins and actor Jason Dohring, best known for his roles in the series Veronica Mars and Moonlight.

References

External links
 Age of Learning, Inc.
 ABCmouse.com
 Neopets site
 The Dohring Company

American businesspeople
American Scientologists
Living people
Year of birth missing (living people)
Neopets